Discovery Civilization was a Latin American pay television channel dedicated to civilization-themed programming, owned by Warner Bros. Discovery.

External links 

Official website 

Warner Bros. Discovery networks
Defunct television channels
Television channels and stations established in 2005
Television channels and stations disestablished in 2021
Television channel articles with incorrect naming style